Ronald Talney (born in New Westminster, British Columbia, Canada) is a poet, who has lived most of his life in Oregon. He has published poems in numerous literary magazines and anthologies, and has published five books of poems including The Anxious Ground, from Press-22 in 1974, and The Quietness That Is Our Name, from Bohematash Press as part of the Pacific House Book Series, and most recently, A Secret Weeping of Stones, New and Selected Poems, from Plain View Press. He has also published a juvenile mystery novel, The Ghost of Deadman's Hollow, from University Editions.

References

American male poets
Living people
People from New Westminster
Poets from Oregon
American people of Canadian descent
Oregon lawyers
Year of birth missing (living people)